Rogier Stoffers,  (born 9 November 1961) is a Dutch cinematographer known for his extensive work in both film and television, shooting movies like Quills, John Q., School of Rock, and Disturbia. He has been nominated for a Primetime Emmy Award and an ASC Award, and is the recipient of a Golden Frog award from the prestigious Camerimage Film Festival.

Life and career 
Stoffers was born in the municipality of Utrecht in the Netherlands, and studied French, and film and Theatre sciences, at Utrecht University, before being accepted into the Cinematography program at the Netherlands Film Academy. He was brought under the wing of director Mike van Diem, with whom he collaborated on the critically acclaimed crime drama Character, which won the Academy Award for Best Foreign Language Film.

After relocating to the United States, he shot the Academy Award-nominated period drama Quills, and the Denzel Washington-starring thriller film John Q. He has since shot numerous well-received mainstream films including Masked and Anonymous, School of Rock, and The Secret Life of Bees, collaborating with directors like Michael Apted, Richard Linklater, Neil LaBute, Ivan Reitman and Eli Roth. His work on the HBO biopic Hemingway & Gellhorn earned him a nomination for a Primetime Emmy Award for Outstanding Cinematography for a Limited Series or Movie.

Filmography 
Films

Television

References

External links
 

1961 births
Mass media people from Utrecht (city)
Dutch cinematographers
Living people
21st-century Dutch people